

Fritz-Georg von Rappard (15 August 1892 – 29 January 1946) was a German general during World War II who commanded the 7th Infantry Division. In 1946, he was part of a group of Wehrmacht personnel tried for war crimes in open court by the Soviet military tribunal in the city of Velikiye Luki. Along with seven other officers of various ranks, Rappard was convicted and executed.

Awards and decorations
 Iron Cross (1914)  2nd Class (11 November 1914) & 1st Class (31 July 1916)
 Iron Cross (1939) 2nd Class (18 June 1940) & 1st Class (24 July 1940)
 German Cross in Gold on 1 June 1944 as Generalleutnant and commander of 7. Infanterie-Division
 Knight's Cross of the Iron Cross with Oak Leaves
 Knight's Cross on 20 October 1944 as Generalleutnant and commander of 7. Infanterie-Division
 Oak Leaves on 24 February 1945 as Generalleutnant and commander of 7. Infanterie Division

References

Citations

Bibliography

 
 
 
 

1892 births
1946 deaths
People from Bramsche
Lieutenant generals of the German Army (Wehrmacht)
German Army personnel of World War I
Recipients of the clasp to the Iron Cross, 1st class
Recipients of the Gold German Cross
Recipients of the Knight's Cross of the Iron Cross with Oak Leaves
Executed military leaders
Executed people from Lower Saxony
People from the Province of Hanover
Nazis executed by the Soviet Union by hanging
Military personnel from Lower Saxony
German Army generals of World War II